USS Estero may refer to the following ships of the United States Navy:

 , was transferred to the Royal Navy and served as Premier.
 , originally served with the United States Army as FS-275, and was acquired by the Navy in March 1947.

United States Navy ship names